Torgeir Børven (born 3 December 1991) is a Norwegian professional footballer who plays as a striker for Norwegian club Vålerenga. He has previously played for FC Twente, Brann, Vålerenga, Odd and Rosenborg, and has represented his country at under-21 level.

Club career
Børven was born in Øystese, where he also grew up but moved to Skien in 2007 to begin at elite sports high school in Telemark and play for Odd Grenland, which has a partnership with the school. He distinguished himself as a prolific goalscorer, and scored eight goals in one reserve match. Børven got his first-team debut and scored his first goal against Vestfossen in the 2009 Norwegian Football Cup.

Børven made his league debut away to against Brann on 28 September 2009, where he scored one goal and had one assist. In 2010, his first full season as a member of Odd Grenland's first team, he scored eight goals in the Norwegian Premier League, including four goals in Odd's 5–0 win against Sandefjord on 26 September 2010.

Odd Grenland wanted to sell Børven ahead of the 2012 season due to economic difficulties, and made an agreement with Aalesund on a transfer for Børven. Børven however, did not want to move to Aalesund and rejected their offer. After scoring eight goals for Odd Grenland in the 2012 season, Børven signed a -year contract with Vålerenga on 17 August 2012. He scored a total of 24 goals in 63 matches for Odd Grenland in Tippeligaen.

International career
On 17 November 2010, Børven made his debut for the Norway under-21 national team, in a 2–1 win against the Republic of Ireland. He scored his first goal for the U21 team against Azerbaijan on 6 October 2011.

Career statistics

Club

Honours

Individual
Eliteserien Top goalscorer: 2019

References

External links
 
 Voetbal International profile 
 

1991 births
Living people
People from Kvam
Norwegian footballers
Association football midfielders
Association football forwards
Norway under-21 international footballers
Odds BK players
Vålerenga Fotball players
Jong FC Twente players
FC Twente players
SK Brann players
MKE Ankaragücü footballers
Eliteserien players
Eredivisie players
Süper Lig players
Norwegian expatriate footballers
Expatriate footballers in the Netherlands
Norwegian expatriate sportspeople in the Netherlands
Expatriate footballers in Turkey
Norwegian expatriate sportspeople in Turkey
Sportspeople from Vestland